İlyas Seçkin (1918 – 17 December 1996)  was a Turkish civil servant, lawyer, politician and former government minister.

Early life and education
İlyas Seçkin was born in Ayaş  ilçe (district) of Ankara Province, Ottoman Empire in 1918. He graduated from the Faculty of Political Science and the Faculty of Law at Ankara University. In 1942, he began serving for the Ministry of Finance. In 1948, while he was an account expert, he resigned from his post at the ministry to work as a free-lance lawyer.

Career
Seçkin joined the Republican People's Party (CHP), and between 1957 and 1969 he served as a deputy from Ankara Province in the 11th, 12th and 13th parliaments. He became a member of the 27th government of Turkey. Between 25 June 1962 and 22 October 1963, he served as the Minister of Public Works. Following a government reshuffle, he was appointed as the Minister of Interior, serving until 25 December 1963.

Seçkin was married and father of two. He died on 17 December 1996.

References

1918 births
People from Ayaş, Ankara
Ankara University Faculty of Political Sciences alumni
Ankara University Faculty of Law alumni
Turkish civil servants
20th-century Turkish lawyers
Republican People's Party (Turkey) politicians
Deputies of Ankara
Members of the 11th Parliament of Turkey
Members of the 12th Parliament of Turkey
Members of the 13th Parliament of Turkey
Members of the 27th government of Turkey
Ministers of the Interior of Turkey
Ministers of Public Works of Turkey
1996 deaths